The Government of Pichilemu comprises the Mayor of Pichilemu and Pichilemu City Council. They are housed within Pichilemu town hall.

Mayor of Pichilemu

The Mayor of Pichilemu is elected every 4 years. The current mayor is Roberto Córdova.

Pichilemu City Council

The Pichilemu City Council is a seven member city council.

References